Le Dumont-d'Urville is the fourth ship of the  of cruise ships operated by Ponant.  Each member of the class has been allocated the name of a famous French explorer. Initially, the fourth ship in the class was to have been named Le Kerguelen, after explorer and naval officer Yves-Joseph de Kerguelen-Trémarec. However, before entering service she was renamed Le Dumont-d'Urville, after Jules Dumont d'Urville, another explorer and naval officer.

Built by VARD, Le Dumont-d'Urville had her hull constructed in VARD's Tulcea yard in Romania.  She was then transferred to the builder's Søviknes facility in Ålesund, Norway, for final outfitting.

Le Dumont-d'Urville was delivered to Ponant in Norway on 14 June 2019, and was due to begin her maiden voyage on 7 August 2019.

References

External links

 Compagnie du Ponant official site page about the ship

2019 ships
Ships built in Norway
Ships built in Romania
Ships of Compagnie du Ponant